The James Kennedy House, also known as the Seven Springs Farm, is a historic house in Columbia, Tennessee, United States.

History
The house was completed in 1840 for James Kennedy, a Kentucky native. It was purchased by Flavius J. Ewing in 1870.

Architectural significance
It has been listed on the National Register of Historic Places since November 6, 1987.

References

Houses on the National Register of Historic Places in Tennessee
Greek Revival houses in Tennessee
Neoclassical architecture in Tennessee
Houses completed in 1840
Houses in Columbia, Tennessee
National Register of Historic Places in Maury County, Tennessee